Abstract Truth was a progressive rock band formed in Durban, KwaZulu-Natal, South Africa in 1969. The band was formed around core member Ken E Henson.

Career 

In 1969, Ken E Henson founded the band with Mike Dickman and Pete Measroch. Abstract Truth released two studio albums in 1970, Totum and Silver Trees, and one in 1971, Cool Sounds For Heads. Ken E Henson died on 24 May 2007 from emphysema.

Albums 

1970: Totum
1970: Silver Trees
1970: Cool Sounds For Heads
2005: Silver Trees & Totum

References 

South African rock music groups
EMI Records artists
South African progressive rock groups
Musical groups established in 1969